Drago Došen (15 October 1943 – 16 November 2019) was a Serbian artist. His paintings and drawings link him to the early 1970s generation of Belgrade painters who turned toward a fundamental experience of nature, reinstating the subject theme in their paintings.

Drago Došen was born in Bosnia in 1943. At a very early age, Došen dedicated himself to the art in which he showed a great talent that led him to a high school of art in Sarajevo.

Upon the completion of high school, Došen continued his studies in Belgrade, where he spent most of his career and established himself as an artist. He graduated from the Academy of the Applied Arts at the University of Belgrade in 1970.

Došen started exhibiting his work in 1975 throughout the former Yugoslavia and other parts of Europe. His work gained attention and it did not take long before his paintings received positive reviews from his fellow artists and the general public.

Throughout 20 years of exhibiting in a number of galleries in many countries, Došen managed to sell well over 400 paintings that went to private and public collections.

In 1995, Došen moved to New Zealand, where he continued to paint and exhibit his work until 2010.

Reviews
Došen's painting is conceived in the subconscious of perception, more in the sphere of obscure recollections than in clearly defined forms of reality. 

The artist's imagination turns the perceivable into the poetic haze of the painting, into the form and content of a new reality in artistic awareness.

Došen's scenes are woven from fine pigment, dreams and nostalgia. They are executed in an almost-forgotten watercolour technique that is rather unusual in our day and age. They reflect the minute craftsmanship of the Northern Renaissance, a touching Neo-Classicism that seems to have gone astray in an age of brutality, the persistence of someone who recalls his native soil with enduring love.

The fluid, nostalgic ambient of these scenes is  brought to life by Došen's ink drawing and watercolours. We can say without exaggeration that Došen has mastered this technique to its pinnacle of perfection.

Došen's scenes conjure up an extraordinary atmosphere, a romantic note resting on the dividing line between present-day aspirations and the heritage of the past.

References

External links
Drago Došen Official Website

1943 births
2019 deaths
Serbian artists
New Zealand artists
University of Belgrade alumni
Serbian emigrants to New Zealand
People from Prijedor